Version 2 Version: A Dub Transmission is the fifteenth solo album by American composer Bill Laswell, released on September 21, 2004, by ROIR.

Track listing

Personnel 
Adapted from the Version 2 Version: A Dub Transmission liner notes.
Musicians

Bernie Worrell – keyboards
Jah Wobble – bass guitar
Bill Laswell – bass guitar, guitar, producer
Karsh Kale – drums, tabla
Abdou M'Boup – percussion
Chris Cookson – drum programming

Technical personnel
Robert Musso – engineering
James Dellatacoma – assistant engineer
Michael Fossenkemper – mastering
Alex Theoret – mastering
John Brown – cover art, design

Release history

References

External links 
 Version 2 Version: A Dub Transmission at Bandcamp
 

2004 albums
Bill Laswell albums
Albums produced by Bill Laswell
ROIR albums